Key to the Ages was the name of an American television series that was broadcast on the now-defunct DuMont Television Network between February and May 1955.

Hosted by Dr. Theodore Low, the program aired from February 27 to May 22, 1955. This literary series originated from WAAM-TV in Baltimore, and may have also aired on ABC stations. The series should not be confused with the similarly titled Key to the Missing, a documentary series which aired on DuMont from 1948-1949.

Key to the Ages lasted only a few months on the air; just a little over one month after the program debuted, in April 1955, the DuMont Television Network began shutting down network operations. This made Key to the Ages one of the last DuMont Network programs. Key aired until May 22, 1955; DuMont itself ceased network operations in August 1956. None of the episodes are known to still exist.

See also
List of programs broadcast by the DuMont Television Network
List of surviving DuMont Television Network broadcasts

References

Bibliography
David Weinstein, The Forgotten Network: DuMont and the Birth of American Television (Philadelphia: Temple University Press, 2004) 
Alex McNeil, Total Television, Fourth edition (New York: Penguin Books, 1980) 
Tim Brooks and Earle Marsh, The Complete Directory to Prime Time Network TV Shows, Third edition (New York: Ballantine Books, 1964)

External links
Key to the Ages at IMDB
DuMont historical website

DuMont Television Network original programming
1955 American television series debuts
1955 American television series endings
1950s American television series
Black-and-white American television shows
Lost television shows